Alice Ravenhill (1859, Epping Forest, England – 1954, British Columbia) was an educational pioneer, a developer of Women's Institutes, and one of the first authors to propound aboriginal rights in B.C. She is also the author of numerous articles and books, including her autobiography which she wrote when she was 92.

Biography

Ravenhill was born in Snaresbrook in 1859. Early in life she took an interest in social issues, causing her to undertake studies in public health, child development, and home economics. She qualified as a sanitary inspector in London. She began her career as an educator in 1893, as a county council lecturer in Bedfordshire and Lincolnshire. In 1894, Ravenhill began three years' service as the secretary to the Royal British Nurses' Association. This was followed by working two years as a lecturer to the Co-operative Society and Women's Co-operative Guild.

At the start of the twentieth century, Ravenhill became a lecturer in Social and Household Science at the University of London. As a representative of the British Board of Education, Ravenhill travelled to the United States to learn more about the teaching of home economics in American universities. Through her studies and work activities, Ravenhill became a leader in developing home economics curricula in post-secondary institutions. She was also active in social welfare issues and was the first woman elected as a Fellow of the Royal Sanitary Institute.

In 1908 hygiene lecturer Ravenhill, Hilda D. Oakeley and Thereza Rucker created a home science course at King's College, London in the Women's Department. Ravenhill had already developed the idea in 1901–1905. By 1920 it was a subject for a degree and in 1928 the King's College of Household and Social Science was formed to further their initial idea.

In 1910, Ravenhill emigrated to Canada and settled at Shawnigan Lake on Vancouver Island with her sister Edith, brother Horace, and Horace's son Leslie. She planned to stay only three or four years until her nephew was sufficiently independent. World War I intervened, the beloved nephew was killed in the Second Battle of Ypres, and Ravenhill never returned to England.  She organized branches of the Women's Institute and travelled extensively throughout the United States and Canada as a lecturer, until accepting the post as Director of Home Economics at the State College in Logan, Utah. Ravenhill held this position until 1919 at which point she became very ill and had to return to British Columbia to convalesce for several years in Victoria with nursing care by her sister Edith.

In about 1926, Ravenhill was asked by the Women's Institute to research aboriginal designs suitable for hooked rugs. This interest led to Ravenhill learning more about the aboriginal culture of British Columbia, ultimately leading her to become a proponent of native rights. In 1938 she published Native Tribes of British Columbia, a book intended to serve as an elementary school curriculum text. Two years later, in collaboration with Anthony Walsh, she founded the Society for the Furtherance of Indian Arts and Crafts in British Columbia, which later became the British Columbia Indian Arts and Welfare Society. She was the first secretary of the Society, and in its first eighteen months of existence, wrote over one thousand letters on its behalf.  She was instrumental in the publication of two children's books, "Tale of the Nativity" which was done by Anthony Walsh's students at the Inkameep Indian School, and "Meet Mr. Coyote", done by Noel Stewart and his students at St. George's Indian Residential School in Lytton, B.C.

Ravenhill received an honorary Doctor of Science from the University of British Columbia in 1948 and an honorary Doctor of Home Economics from the American Association of Home Economics in 1950.

Books

Ravenhill left her papers, including articles written by her, to the Special Collections division of the UBC Library . Books written by Ravenhill include:

 Lessons In Practical Hygiene For Use In Schools (1907)
  Moral Instruction And Training In Girls’ Elementary Schools In England (1908)
 The Native Tribes of British Columbia (1938)
 A Corner Stone of Canadian Culture: An Outline of the Arts and Crafts of the Indian Tribes of British Columbia (1944)
 Memoirs of an Educational Pioneer  (1951)
 Folklore of the Far West, With Some Clues to Characteristics and Customs (1953)

References

Sources
 BC Bookworld biography
 Ravenhill, Alice, Memoirs of an Educational Pioneer

External links
 
 

1859 births
1954 deaths
Education in British Columbia
English emigrants to Canada
Canadian educators
Academics in British Columbia
Persons of National Historic Significance (Canada)
People from Vancouver Island
Utah State University faculty
Canadian social commentators
Co-operative Women's Guild